Witching hour is a time of night associated with supernatural events.

Witching Hour or The Witching Hour may also refer to:

Music
Witching Hour (Ladytron album), 2005
Witching Hour (The Vision Bleak album), 2013
"Witching Hour" (song), a 2018 song by Rezz
"Witching Hour", a song on the 1981 album Welcome to Hell by Venom
"Witching Hour", a song on the 2017 album Preserved Roses by Blackbriar
"Witching Hour", a song on the 2017 album Ritual by In This Moment
"The Witching Hour", a song on the 1997 album The Divine Wings of Tragedy by Symphony X
"The Witching Hour", a song on the 2010 album Familial by Phil Selway
"Witching Hour", a song by Madeline Kenney from Night Night at the First Landing

Film
The Witching Hour, a 1916 film melodrama featuring Helen Arnold
The Witching Hour (1921 film), an American silent drama 
The Witching Hour (1934 film), an American film
The Witching Hour (1985 film), a Spanish film

Literature
The Witching Hour (novel), a 1990 horror novel by Anne Rice
The Witching Hour (DC Comics), a comic horror anthology published 1969–1978
The Witching Hour (Vertigo), a 1999 graphic novel by writer Jeph Loeb and artist Chris Bachalo

Other uses

The Witching Hour, a painting by Andrew Wyeth

See also
Triple witching hour, in American investing, the time near the end of each quarter when certain financial derivatives expire simultaneously